KSSR may refer to:

 Kazakh Soviet Socialist Republic, now Kazakhstan
 Kirghiz Soviet Socialist Republic, now Kyrgyzstan
 KSSR-FM, a radio station (95.9 FM) licensed to Santa Rosa, New Mexico, United States
 KSSR (AM), a defunct radio station (1340 AM) licensed to Santa Rosa, New Mexico, United States